Lakmal Kasturiarachchige or Lakmal Kasthuri Arachchige (born 22 December 1986) is an Austrian cricketer. He played for Austria in the 2011 ICC European T20 Championship Division One tournament. In May 2021, he was named in Austria's squad for the 2021 Central Europe Cup. He made his Twenty20 International (T20I) debut on 21 May 2021, for Austria against Luxembourg.

References

1986 births
Living people
Austrian cricketers
Austria Twenty20 International cricketers
People from Western Province, Sri Lanka
People from Panadura
Austrian people of Sri Lankan descent